HD 150576 is a double star in the southern constellation of Ara. It has a twelfth magnitude companion at an angular separation of 28.3″ along a position angle of 39° (as of 2000).

References

External links
 HR 6207
 Image HD 150576

Ara (constellation)
150576
Double stars
G-type giants
6207
Durchmusterung objects
081966